Francesco Dracone (born 21 September 1983) is an Italian racing driver who currently competes in the European Le Mans Series with BHK Motorsport.

Career
Born in Turin, Dracone began racing professionally in the Italian Formula Three Championship in 2002. He raced in that series until 2005. In 2006 he moved to Euroseries 3000 driving for Euronova Racing. He finished 21st in points. He returned in 2007 driving for ASR and 2G Racing finishing 23rd in points. In 2008 he drove for Emmebi Motorsport and improved to 17th in points. He returned to the team and series in 2009 and improved further to 7th in points with a best finish of 5th at Monza. He also competed in the International Superstars Series season finale at Kyalami for Ferlito Motors. In July 2010 he participated in an IndyCar Series rookie test with Conquest Racing. After passing the test he signed on to compete with the team at the Mid-Ohio Sports Car Course and Infineon Raceway.

He was slowest among drivers who logged a qualifying time at Mid-Ohio but started 23rd on the 27 car grid due to being in the same group as Milka Duno who elected not to participate in qualifying and Graham Rahal who was penalized. Dracone finished the race 3 laps down in 22nd place. He started last at Infineon, despite being a second quicker than Duno. The race saw Dracone spin off track close to the finish and he was credited with 20th place. He finished 37th in the championship.

After four years in Auto GP he returned to IndyCar in 2015, signing a deal to drive the first four races for Dale Coyne Racing. At NOLA Motorsports Park he spun on the first lap but rejoined, before hitting his mechanic Todd Phillips after losing control of his car in the pit lane.

Racing record

American open–wheel results

(key)

IndyCar Series

Complete Auto GP results
(key) (Races in bold indicate pole position; races in italics indicate fastest lap)

† Driver did not finish the race, but was classified as he completed over 90% of the race distance.

Complete European Le Mans Series results
(key) (Races in bold indicate pole position; results in italics indicate fastest lap)

References

External links
 
 
 

1983 births
Living people
Racing drivers from Turin
IndyCar Series drivers
Italian Formula Three Championship drivers
Auto GP drivers
Superstars Series drivers
Virtuosi Racing drivers
European Le Mans Series drivers
Ombra Racing drivers
Conquest Racing drivers
Dale Coyne Racing drivers
Euronova Racing drivers
Super Nova Racing drivers